John MacLachlan Gray, OC (born John Howard Gray; 26 September 1946) is a Canadian writer-composer-performer for stage, TV, film, radio and print. He is best known for his stage musicals and for his two seasons as a satirist on CBC TV's The Journal, as well as an author, speaker and social critic on cultural-political issues.

Bio
Born in Ottawa, Ontario, and raised in Nova Scotia, Gray obtained a B.A. at Mount Allison University, and an M.A. at the University of British Columbia. While attending the latter, he founded Tamahnous Theatre, and served as its director from 1971 to 1974. He then joined Theatre Passe Muraille in Toronto, Ontario, where he began writing and composing for the stage. His first musical was "18 Wheels," about truck drivers.

Plays
In 1978, with Eric Peterson, he wrote and composed Billy Bishop Goes to War, which appeared on Broadway in New York City in 1980, produced by Mike Nichols, and in London's West End. It has since been performed in over 150 independent productions in Canada and the United States. The play appeared on television in a BBC-CBC co-production, and in a German version, Billy Bishop Steig Auf. Billy Bishop Goes to War was the winner of the Los Angeles Drama Critics Award in 1981, the Governor General's Award for Drama, and the 1982 Floyd S. Chalmers Canadian Play Award.

In 2009, Peterson and Gray returned to their roles at Soulpepper Theater in Toronto, in a re-mounting where Bishop tells his story, wearing pajamas and dressing-gown, near the end of his life.   Directed by Ted Dykstra, the production received rave reviews, and continues to be performed at Soulpepper and at other venues across Canada.

In 2010, the play was shot for CBC Television in partnership with Strada Productions, directed by Barbara Willis-Sweete.

Musicals
Gray has written and composed six other musicals including 18 Wheels, Rock and Roll, Don Messer's Jubilee, Health, and Amelia: The Girl Who Wants to Fly (2011). Rock and Roll won a Dora Mavor Moore Award in 1982, and became an award-winning feature video entitled King of Friday Night.

Gray's most recent musical is TheTree. TheTower. TheFlood, three Bible stories for the age of information, commissioned by CBC Radio Drama.

Newspaper columnist
In the late 1990s, Gray became a newspaper columnist, contributing weekly pieces on cultural politics to the Vancouver Sun and The Globe and Mail. In the early 2000s he contributed a column to Western Living Magazine called "O For the Love of Dog," in which he wrote about his dog Gus.

Novelist
Around that time he abandoned the theatre in favour of the novel – in a series of thrillers set in post-modern Vancouver, mid-19th century England and the United States before the Civil War. As with Billy Bishop Goes to War, Gray casts an ironic contemporary eye on imagined historical events.

He is the recipient of a Golden Globe, and the Governor General's Medal. In 2000, he was made an Officer of the Order of Canada for "his contribution to Canada's cultural landscape". He holds honorary doctorates from Dalhousie University and Mount Allison University.

John Gray lives in Vancouver, British Columbia with his wife Beverlee. They have two sons, Zachary (a musician and actor) and Ezra ( a visual artist).

Bibliography
 Billy Bishop Goes to War – 1982 (with Eric Peterson)
 Dazzled! – 1984
 Local Boy Makes Good – 1987
 I Love Mom: An Irreverent History of the Tattoo – 1994
 Lost in North America: The Imaginary Canadian in the American Dream – 1994
 A Gift for the Little Master – 2000
 The Friend in Human – 2003
 in German: Der menschliche Dämon. Transl. Edith Walter. Heyne Verlag 2005
 White Stone Day – 2005
 Not Quite Dead − 2007
 The White Angel - 2017

Awards, Selected
Governor General's Medal
Los Angeles Drama Critics' Dramalogue Award
Gold Award, New York Film and Television Festival
ACTRA Award (Nellie), Best Production, 1983
Canadian Film and Television Award
Silver Hugo Award, Chicago
Rocky Award, Banff Television Festival, Best Variety Production
National Magazine Award
Dora Mavor Moore Award (2)
Western Magazine Award (6)

References

 Gray entry in The Canadian Encyclopedia

External links 
Records of Tamahnous Theatre are held by Simon Fraser University's Special Collections and Rare Books

1946 births
Living people
20th-century Canadian dramatists and playwrights
21st-century Canadian dramatists and playwrights
20th-century Canadian novelists
21st-century Canadian novelists
Canadian male novelists
Canadian people of British descent
Canadian television personalities
Dora Mavor Moore Award winners
Governor General's Award-winning dramatists
Mount Allison University alumni
Officers of the Order of Canada
People from Colchester County
Writers from Nova Scotia
Writers from Ottawa
Canadian satirists
Canadian male dramatists and playwrights
20th-century Canadian male writers
21st-century Canadian male writers
Canadian male non-fiction writers